Live at the Olympia '96 is a live double album by British hard rock band Deep Purple. It was recorded at the Olympia in Paris on 17 June 1996 during the Purpendicular tour and released in 1997.

Initial copies of the release have a round sticker on the front of the CD jewel-case, stating 'Official Bootleg'.

One of only three Deep Purple live albums to feature a performance of "Maybe I'm a Leo", the other being Deep Purple in Concert and Live at Montreux 2011.

Track listing
All songs written by Ian Gillan, Ritchie Blackmore, Roger Glover, Jon Lord and Ian Paice except where noted.

Personnel
Deep Purple
 Ian Gillan – vocals, harmonica
 Steve Morse – guitar
 Roger Glover – bass
 Jon Lord – organ, keyboards
 Ian Paice – drums

Additional musicians
Featured on "Highway Star", "Cascades: I'm Not Your Lover", "No One Came", "The Purpendicular Waltz"
Vincent Chavagnac – saxophone
Christian Fourquet – trombone
Eric Mula – trumpet

Production
Alain Francais – engineer
Darren Schneider – premixing at Greg Rike Productions, Florida
Rory Young – digital editing
Peter Deneberg – digital editing, mixing at Acme Studios, Mamaroneck, New York

Charts

References

Albums recorded at the Olympia (Paris)
1997 live albums
EMI Records live albums
Deep Purple live albums